Fishing Bay Wildlife Management Area is a Wildlife Management Area in Dorchester County, Maryland. The area is the largest wildlife management area in Maryland. Adjoining Blackwater National Wildlife Refuge, the area is about 80 percent tidal marshland.

References

External links
Fishing Bay Wildlife Management Area

Wildlife management areas of Maryland
Protected areas of Dorchester County, Maryland